The 1856 United States presidential election in Missouri was held on November 4, 1856. Voters chose nine electors to represent the state in the Electoral College, which chose the president and vice president.

Missouri voted for the Democratic nominee James Buchanan, who received 54% of the vote.

Republican Party nominee John C. Frémont was not on the ballot.

, this is the last time Gasconade County voted for a Democratic presidential candidate.

Results

See also
 United States presidential elections in Missouri

References

1856
Missouri
1856 in Missouri